Naarden-Bussum is a railway station in the north of Bussum, Netherlands that also serves the neighboring community of Naarden. The station has one standard platform and one island platform. It has a total of four tracks, of which one track is for passing trains only. The station was opened on 10 June 1874. The station is on the Amsterdam - Hilversum - Amersfoort line, known as the Gooilijn. The station was also used as a tram station for the Bussum - Huizen tram service from 1883 to 1958.

Train services
The following train services call at Naarden-Bussum:
2x per hour local service (sprinter) Utrecht - Hilversum - Almere Oostvaarders
2x per hour local service (sprinter) The Hague - Leiden - Hoofddorp - Schiphol - Duivendrecht - Hilversum - Utrecht
2x per hour local service (sprinter) Hoofddorp - Amsterdam - Hilversum - Amersfoort Vathorst

Bus services
The following bus services call at Station Naarden-Bussum. These depart from the bus station at the front of the station.

External links
NS website 
Dutch Public Transport journey planner 

Railway stations in North Holland
Railway stations opened in 1874
Buildings and structures in Gooise Meren